Ensure is an American brand of nutritional supplements and meal replacements manufactured by Abbott Laboratories. 

A 237-ml (8-fl oz) bottle of Ensure Original contains 220 calories, six grams of fat, 15 grams of sugar, and nine grams of protein. The top six ingredients are water, corn maltodextrin, sugar, milk protein concentrate, canola oil, and soy protein isolate. Ensure is considered lactose-free for people with lactose intolerance.

History
In 1903, Harry C. Moores and Stanley M. Ross launched the "Moores & Ross Milk Company", which specialized in bottling milk for home delivery for the first few years. By 1964, however, the company merged with Abbott Laboratories. A drink called Ensure was first marketed by Ross Laboratories in 1973.

In the 1990s, Ensure and other nutritional drink products like Mead Johnson's Sustacal and Nestlé's Boost and Resource brands were fiercely competing to capture market share among healthy adults. In 1996, Ensure had sales of about $300 million and accounted for 80% of protein supplement sales; Abbott spent $45.4 million to advertise Ensure during the first nine months of 1996, around 70% more than it spent during the same period of 1995.

Criticism 
In 1995, the Center for Science in the Public Interest said that ads for Ensure were "the most misleading food ad" of that year. In 1997, Abbott settled charges from the Federal Trade Commission that it was falsely marketing Ensure as having similar amounts of vitamins as multivitamin supplements, and as recommended by doctors more than any other nutritional supplement as a way for people to stay active and healthy.

Ensure has been used in the force feeding of hunger-striking prisoners at the United States' Guantanamo Bay detention camps.

Products
When Abbott split off its pharmaceuticals division, Abbvie, in 2013, the Ensure product line remained with Abbott along with other nutritional products. 

As of 2016, variants of Ensure included:

 Ensure Original
 Ensure Original Pudding 
 Ensure Plus 
 Ensure Enlive
 Ensure High Protein
 Ensure Clear
 Ensure Light
 Ensure Compact
 Ensure Original Nutrition Powder 
 Ensure Muscle Health

As of 2016, Ensure Complete had been discontinued.

See also 

 Dietary supplement
 Force-feeding
 Liquid diet
 Protein shake
 Therapeutic food

References

External links
 

Dietary supplements
Abbott Laboratories